Alexander Parygin (born 25 April 1973) is a Kazakhstani-Australian modern pentathlete and Olympic champion. He competed at the 1996 Summer Olympics in Atlanta where he won the individual gold medal.

He competed for Australia at the 2004 Summer Olympics in Athens and finished 27th overall. He initially qualified for the 2008 Summer Olympics in Beijing, but his qualification was called into question by the British team for failing to meet the minimum number of points required to be eligible (as his qualification took place at the Oceanian Championship in Tokyo, where the show jumping segment was called off after an outbreak of equine flu; however, the Australian Olympic Committee initially insisted he had met the requirements), and was eventually revoked by the Court of Arbitration for Sport (CAS). Alex now lives in Melbourne, Australia.

References

External links
 

1973 births
Living people
Sportspeople from Almaty
Australian male modern pentathletes
Kazakhstani male modern pentathletes
Modern pentathletes at the 1996 Summer Olympics
Modern pentathletes at the 2004 Summer Olympics
Olympic gold medalists for Kazakhstan
Olympic modern pentathletes of Kazakhstan
Olympic modern pentathletes of Australia
Olympic medalists in modern pentathlon
Asian Games medalists in modern pentathlon
Modern pentathletes at the 1994 Asian Games
Medalists at the 1996 Summer Olympics
Asian Games gold medalists for Kazakhstan
Asian Games silver medalists for Kazakhstan
Medalists at the 1994 Asian Games
Kazakhstani people of Russian descent